Herbert von Reyl (28 April 1898 – 11 June 1937) was an Austrian painter. His work was part of the painting event in the art competition at the 1936 Summer Olympics.

References

1898 births
1937 deaths
20th-century Austrian painters
Austrian male painters
Olympic competitors in art competitions
Artists from Vienna
20th-century Austrian male artists